Iruka Okeke is a Nigerian microbiologist who studies the genetics of enteric disease-causing bacteria such as E. coli. She also researches ways to improve microbiology laboratory practices in Africa. She is a fellow of the Nigerian Academy of Sciences and the African Academy of Sciences.

Early life and education 
Okeke was born in England to Nigerian parents. She later moved to Nigeria to attend secondary school. She attended Obafemi Awolowo University, Nigeria, where she obtained a BPharm, an MSc, and a PhD. As part of her PhD she spent a year at the Centre for Vaccine Development, University of Maryland as a Fulbright Scholar.

Research career 
Okeke carried out her postdoctoral research at the University of Maryland, USA and Uppsala University, Sweden. In 2000 she moved to the University of Bradford, England, as a teaching faculty member. She then moved to Haverford College, USA in 2002  as an Associate Professor before becoming a full Professor in 2014. During her time at Haverford  she was a Branco Weiss Fellow of the Society of Science between 2004-2009, and a Fellow of the Institute for Advanced Studies, Berlin from 2010-11.

Her research has focused on using bacterial genetics to understand the molecular epidemiology, colonization, pathogenesis and antimicrobial resistance of enteric bacteria. She has studied the surface proteins of E. coli and described how these proteins help the bacteria colonize the gut. 

In 2014, Okeke moved to the University of Ibadan, Nigeria, supported by the UK Medical Research Council and UK Department for International Development as an African Research Leader. In 2019 she was awarded funding from the Grand Challenge Africa drug discovery scheme to identify potential drugs compounds against bacterial disease She is also working on low-cost technology solutions to monitor antimicrobial resistance in low-income settings, with support from the Bill & Melinda Gates Foundation.

. In 2015 she was awarded funding from the Microbiology Society to reform a masters course in Pharmaceutical Biology at the University of Ibadan.  Observing that students had limited laboratory experience, she developed a course that included more practical laboratory elements. This involved a collaboration of scientists from different fields including bacteriologists, molecular biologists, and natural product researchers. The course content focused on studying leaf microbiomes of plants used in Nigerian ethnomedicine. She has also written a book, Divining Without Seeds: The case for strengthening laboratory medicine in Africa, with the aim to assist researchers as well as policy makers.

On 2018 she spoke at  the World Economic Forum,about ways to improve antimicrobial surveillance in African countries. She has also served on committees and acted as a consultant for the Wellcome Trust Surveillance and Epidemiology of Drug Resistant Infections Consortium, the Nigerian Centre for Disease Control, the World Health Organization, and the Nigerian Global Antibiotic Resistance Partnership Network.

In 2017 she was appointed editor-in-chief of the African Journal of Laboratory Medicine.

Awards and honours 
 Elected as a fellow of The African Academy of Science in 2018.
 Elected as a fellow of the Nigerian Academy of Science in 2018.

Personal life 
Okeke is married and has a daughter.

References 

Nigerian scientists
Women microbiologists
Year of birth missing (living people)
Living people
Fellows of the African Academy of Sciences
Fellows of the Nigerian Academy of Science